Bibeau is a surname of French origin. Notable people with the surname include:

Antoine Bibeau (born 1994), Canadian professional ice hockey goaltender
Marie Bibeau (1865–1924), first Superior General of the Little Franciscans of Mary
Marie-Claude Bibeau, Canadian politician
Michael Zehaf-Bibeau (1982–2014) (aka Joseph Paul Michael Bibeau), the perpetrator of the 2014 shootings at Parliament Hill, Ottawa
Ray Bibeau, Canadian ice hockey player
Rénald Bibeau, Canadian politician